Beaver Valley Power Station is a nuclear power plant on the Ohio River covering  near Shippingport, Pennsylvania, United States,  roughly northwest of Pittsburgh. The Beaver Valley plant is operated by Energy Harbor and power is generated by two Westinghouse pressurized water reactors.

FirstEnergy announced that it expected to close Beaver Valley in 2021 without legislative relief or sale to another utility company. More recently, however, FirstEnergy announced that because of Governor Tom Wolf's decision to join the Regional Greenhouse Gas Initiative the company intends to keep the facility in operation.

Electricity Production

Surrounding population

The 2010 U.S. population within  of Beaver Valley was 114,514, a decrease of 6.6 percent in a decade, according to an analysis of U.S. Census data for msnbc.com. The 2010 U.S. population within  was 3,140,766, a decrease of 3.7 percent since 2000. Cities within 50 miles include Pittsburgh (27 miles away, located upriver from the station).

Seismic risk
The Nuclear Regulatory Commission's estimate of the risk each year of an earthquake intense enough to cause core damage to the reactor at Beaver Valley was Reactor 1: 1 in 20,833; Reactor 2: 1 in 45,455, according to an NRC study published in August 2010.

Fessenheim
Beaver Valley 1 was used as the reference design for the French nuclear plant at Fessenheim.

See also

 Shippingport Reactor - Located adjacent to the Beaver Valley Power Station

References

External links

Energy infrastructure completed in 1976
Energy infrastructure completed in 1987
Buildings and structures in Beaver County, Pennsylvania
Nuclear power plants in Pennsylvania
Nuclear power stations using pressurized water reactors
FirstEnergy
1976 establishments in Pennsylvania